Pau Francisco Torres (born 16 January 1997) is a Spanish professional footballer who plays as a centre-back for La Liga club Villarreal and the Spain national team.

Club career
Born in Villarreal, Province of Castellón, Valencian Community, Torres played youth football with Villarreal. He made his league debut with the reserves on 21 August 2016, starting in a 1–0 Segunda División B away loss against Cornellà.

Torres scored his first senior goal on 8 October 2016, the first in a 2–2 home draw with Badalona. His maiden competitive appearance for the first team took place on 20 December, when he came on as a late substitute for Víctor Ruiz in the 1–1 home draw against Toledo in the round of 32 of Copa del Rey; by doing so, he became the first player born in Villarreal to debut for the club in 13 years.

Torres played his first match in La Liga on 26 November 2017, replacing fellow youth graduate Manu Trigueros late into a 2–3 home loss to Sevilla. He made his UEFA Europa League debut ten days later, starting and finishing the 0–1 group stage defeat against Maccabi Tel Aviv also at the Estadio de la Cerámica.

On 6 August 2018, Torres was loaned to Málaga for one year. He only missed four Segunda División games during his spell as the side reached the promotion play-offs and, subsequently, was recalled by his parent club.

Torres subsequently cemented his place in Villarreal's starting XI, playing every minute in the league. In October 2019, he was rewarded with a contract extension until 2024, and the same month scored his first goal in the Spanish top tier, opening a 2–1 loss at Osasuna.

International career
Torres got his first call up for the Spain national team by Robert Moreno on 4 October 2019, for UEFA Euro 2020 qualifiers against Norway and Sweden. He did not debut until 15 November when he scored in a 7–0 rout of Malta for the already qualified hosts, within a minute of replacing Sergio Ramos; Dani Olmo also scored on his first cap in that game, the first time that two Spaniards did so in exactly 30 years.

Torres was included in Luis Enrique's 24-man squad for the finals. He was also selected for the Olympic team that won a silver medal at the Summer Olympics in Tokyo.

Career statistics

Club

International

Spain score listed first, score column indicates score after each Torres goal.

Honours
Villarreal
UEFA Europa League: 2020–21

Spain U23
Summer Olympics silver medal: 2020

Spain
UEFA Nations League runner up: 2020–21

Individual
UEFA Europa League Squad of the Season: 2020–21

References

External links

Villarreal official profile

1997 births
Living people
People from Villarreal
Sportspeople from the Province of Castellón
Spanish footballers
Footballers from the Valencian Community
Association football defenders
La Liga players
Segunda División players
Segunda División B players
Villarreal CF C players
Villarreal CF B players
Villarreal CF players
Málaga CF players
UEFA Europa League winning players
Spain under-21 international footballers
Spain under-23 international footballers
Spain international footballers
UEFA Euro 2020 players
2022 FIFA World Cup players
Olympic footballers of Spain
Footballers at the 2020 Summer Olympics
Olympic medalists in football
Olympic silver medalists for Spain
Medalists at the 2020 Summer Olympics